Tasman is a former New Zealand parliamentary electorate, from 1972 to 1996.

Population centres
There were 84 electorates for the 1969 election, and the 1972 electoral redistribution saw three additional general seats created for the North Island, bringing the total number of electorates to 87. Together with increased urbanisation in Christchurch and Nelson, the changes proved very disruptive to existing electorates. In the South Island, three electorates were abolished, and three electorates were newly created (including Tasman). In the North Island, five electorates were abolished, two electorates were recreated, and six electorates were newly created. The Tasman and West Coast electorates replaced the former Buller and Westland electorates in 1972.

Population centres of the original Tasman electorate were Collingwood, Tākaka, Motueka, Richmond, Havelock, Picton, Owen River, Murchison, Saint Arnaud, and Springs Junction. In the 1977 electoral redistribution, the city of Nelson had experienced population growth and many of the Nelson suburbs were transferred from the  electorate to the Tasman electorate. To compensate for this, Springs Junction went to the West Coast electorate, and Picton was transferred to the  electorate. There were only minor boundary changes through the 1983 electoral redistribution. In the 1987 electoral redistribution, the remaining area of the Marlborough Sounds including Havelock transferred to the Marlborough electorate.

History
Labour's Bill Rowling had represented the  electorate since the 1962 Buller by-election and when Buller was abolished in 1972, Rowling transferred to the Tasman electorate. Rowling was leader of the Labour Party from 1974 to 1983, and was Prime Minister at the beginning of that period (September 1974 – December 1975) while representing Tasman.

In 1996, the first mixed-member proportional (MMP) election, the electorate was combined with the  electorate to form the  electorate. At that time, Smith transferred to the Nelson electorate.

Members of Parliament
Key

Election results

1993 election

1990 election

1987 election

1984 election

1981 election

1978 election

1975 election

1972 election

Notes

References

Historical electorates of New Zealand
Politics of the Tasman District
1972 establishments in New Zealand
1996 disestablishments in New Zealand